Carl Frederik Bricka (10 July 1845 – 23 August 1903) was a Danish archivist, historian and biographer.

Biography
Carl  Bricka was born in Copenhagen, Denmark. His father, Frederik Vilhelm Theodor Bricka (1809-79),  was a medical doctor. He attended Metropolitanskolen and   earned his Magister degree from the University of Copenhagen (1870). He became an assistant at the Danish Royal Library in 1871. During the period 1883-97, he was employed in the Danish National Archives, after which he became the department head  (Rigsarkivar). 

Bricka became a member of the board of the Danish Historical Society and edited the historical magazine published by the association (1878-97).
He also served as  editor of Danske Magazin (1883-1901). From 1885 until his death in 1903, he was the publisher of the Dansk biografisk lexikon: tillige omfattende Norge for Tidsrummet 1537–1814. The first edition of this Danish biographic encyclopedia was published by Gyldendal in 19 volumes between 1887 to 1905. He died in Copenhagen and was buried at Frederiksberg Ældre Kirkegård.

References

Other sources
L.L.: Bricka, Carl Frederik, in Blangstrup, Christian (ed.): Salmonsens Konversationsleksikon, Copenhagen 1915 – 1930, vol. III (1915), p. 947f. URL last accessed 2007-09-15.

External links
  Dansk biografisk Lexikon - Project Runeberg 

1845 births
1903 deaths
People from Copenhagen
University of Copenhagen alumni
19th-century Danish historians
20th-century Danish historians

Knights of the Order of the Dannebrog